Degema may refer to:

Degema language, a Nigerian language
Degema, Nigeria, a Local Government Area in Rivers State